Umon (Amon) is an Upper Cross River language of Nigeria.

References

Languages of Nigeria
Upper Cross River languages